Andıl is a village in the District of Kozan, Adana Province, Turkey. Near the village are the remains of a monastic fortified estate house as well as a rectangular building (possibly the scriptorium) and the fragments of a medieval civilian settlement, all associated with the Armenian Kingdom of Cilicia. This site was the subject of an archaeological survey in 1979.

References

Villages in Kozan District